Good Intentions is a 2010 American comedy film directed by Jim Issa. It is about Etta Milford (Elaine Hendrix), a Georgian housewife who creates a scheme to get back money for her family.

Storyline
Etta Milford (Elaine Hendrix) is saddled with taking care of her rambunctious children in a poor Georgia town while her husband, Chester (Luke Perry), spends all their money on his makeshift inventions. Etta hatches a plan to get back money for her family. It includes holding up her own husband's liquor store, blackmailing the sheriff, and robbing the grocery store.

Cast
Elaine Hendrix as Etta Milford
Luke Perry as Chester Milford
Jon Gries as Sheriff Ernie
Jimmi Simpson as Kyle
LeAnn Rimes as Pam
Gary Grubbs as Zachary
Gregory Alan Williams as Buck
Randy McDowell as Rob
Jim Cody Williams as Bo
Ted Manson as Mr. Simmons

Filming
The film was shot on location in Atlanta, Georgia, and Rutledge, Georgia.

DVD release
The DVD was released by Phase 4 Films on March 9, 2010.

References

External links
 

2010 films
2010 comedy films
American comedy films
2010s English-language films
2010s American films